Rostow is an Americanized form of the Russian and Ashkenazi Jewish toponymic surname Rostov (Russian: Ростов; masculine) or Rostova (Ростова; feminine). It indicates someone from Rostov in Russia. Notable people with the surname include:

Elspeth Rostow (1917–2007), American educator and policy advisor
Eugene V. Rostow (1913–2002), American jurist
Walt Whitman Rostow (1916–2003), American economist and political theorist

See also
Rostov (disambiguation)
Rostov, town in Russia
Rostov-on-Don, city in Russia
Rostovsky (disambiguation)